An indirect presidential election (officially the 9th Federal Convention) was held in West Germany on 23 May 1989. The only candidate was incumbent President Richard von Weizsäcker, who had the support of all four major parties (CDU/CSU, SPD, FDP, and The Greens). It is so far the only time that a presidential candidate ran unopposed. It was also the last presidential election held before German reunification.

Composition of the Federal Convention
The President is elected by the Federal Convention consisting of all the members of the Bundestag and an equal number of delegates representing the states. These are divided proportionally by population to each state, and each state's delegation is divided among the political parties represented in its parliament so as to reflect the partisan proportions in the parliament.

Source: Eine Dokumentation aus Anlass der Wahl des Bundespräsidenten am 18. März 2012

Results

References

1989 in West Germany
1989
Single-candidate elections
May 1989 events in Europe
1989 elections in Germany
Richard von Weizsäcker